Casten is both a surname and a given name.

People with the surname Casten 
 Richard F. Casten (born 1941), American nuclear physicist
 Tom Casten, American businessman known for his work on industrial energy recycling.

People with the given name Casten 
 Casten Almqvist (born 1962), Swedish businessman
 Casten Nemra (born 1971), politician in the Marshall Islands